The Henschel Hs 125 was a German advanced training aircraft prototype featuring a single engine and low wing, designed by Henschel & Son and tested by the Luftwaffe in 1934. Only two prototypes were ever built.

Specifications

References

Hs 125
1930s German military trainer aircraft
Single-engined tractor aircraft
Low-wing aircraft
World War II experimental aircraft of Germany
World War II trainer aircraft of Germany